Karlāṇī is a Pashtun tribal confederacy. They primarily inhabit the FATA region of Khyber Pakhtunkhwa province of Pakistan and certain parts of eastern Afghanistan. In the 16th century the Karlani founded the Karrani dynasty, the last dynasty to rule the Bengal Sultanate.

The legend of Karlani in the folklore says:

"In his infancy he became an orphan and after losing his family he alone survived and was adopted by the Ormur Tribe. The tribe gave him shelter & protection & raised him like their own son. When he reached a marriageable age, the chief of the Ormur tribe made Karlan his son in law." But actually He is not the son of Ghurghusht nor Ormur.

Legacy
Karlan had two sons named Kodi and Kaki, then Kodi had two sons named (Dilzak) Dilazak and (Shamak Khan) Orakzai from whom the first branch of  Karlani tribes descend.

See also
 Nimat Allah al-Harawi author of Tarikh-i-Khan Jahani Makhzan-i-Afghani also known as The History of the Afghans
 Amir Kror Suri

References